It's a Game is the fourth album by Edith Frost, released in 2005 through Drag City.

Critical reception
The Chicago Tribune called it "a profound, stylistically boundless album that's one of [2005]'s finest records." Billboard wrote that "Frost's voice is still sweet and innocent sounding, but her subject matters are hardly lightweight material."

Track listing

Personnel 
Musicians
Joshua Abrams – bass guitar
Lindsay Anderson – piano
Dave "Max" Crawford – trumpet
Edith Frost – vocals, guitar, photography
Mark Greenberg – organ, engineering, mixing
John Hasbrouck – guitar
Ryan Hembrey – bass guitar
Emmett Kelly – guitar
Rian Murphy – drums, production
Jason Toth – drums
Azita Youssefi – piano
Production and additional personnel
Barry Phipps – engineering, mixing
Roger Seibel – mastering

References

External links 
 

2005 albums
Drag City (record label) albums
Edith Frost albums